The Championship Weekend is the annual championship tournament of the Canadian Elite Basketball League (CEBL). Four teams play in a final four single-elimination tournament to determine the league champion. In addition to the host team, three teams qualify through regular season play or play-in games.

Results

Champions

Results by teams
Note: Statistics include the semi-finals and final of the 2020 Summer Series which was held in lieu of the Championship Weekend due to the COVID-19 pandemic.

Notes

References

External links 

Canadian Elite Basketball League
Annual sporting events in Canada
Recurring sporting events established in 2019
Basketball competitions in Canada